Home County Music & Art Festival (formerly Home County Folk Festival) is a festival held the third weekend of July in London, Ontario.

The festival is an admission by donation festival held in Victoria Park in downtown London. The festival is hosted by the Home County Folk League, a non-profit organization which was formed in 1973, and they have held a festival every year since 1974.

References

External links
 Home County Music & Art Festival official site

Folk festivals in Canada
Festivals in London, Ontario
Music festivals in Ontario
Music festivals established in 1973